UFC 289 is an upcoming mixed martial arts event produced by the Ultimate Fighting Championship that will take place on June 10, 2023, at a TBD venue and location.

Announced bouts 
Women's Flyweight bout: Miranda Maverick vs. Jasmine Jasudavicius
Middleweight bout: Eryk Anders vs. Marc-André Barriault

See also 

 List of UFC events
 List of current UFC fighters
 2023 in UFC

References 

 

UFC Fight Night
2023 in mixed martial arts
Scheduled mixed martial arts events